Gunnlaugur  is an Icelandic given name, originally from Old Norse Gunnlaugr . Notable people with the name include:

 Gunnlaugur Jónsson (born 1974), Icelandic football manager
 Gunnlaugur Scheving (1904–1972), Icelandic painter
 Gunnlaugr Leifsson (died c. 1218), Icelandic scholar, author and poet
 Gunnlaugr Ormstunga (c. 983–1008), Icelandic poet

See also
 Gunnlaugsson

Icelandic masculine given names